Jay Abraham (born January 8, 1949) is an American business executive, conference speaker, and author. He is known for developing strategies in the direct response marketing industry in the 1970s. In 2000, Forbes listed him as one of the top five executive coaches in the US. He is the founder and CEO of the Abraham Group, a marketing consulting firm for businesses.

Personal life 
Jay Abraham was born on January 8, 1949, in Indianapolis, Indiana. He lives in Los Angeles County, California, with his wife and children.

Career 
Abraham is the founder and CEO of The Abraham Group, which provides business consulting focusing on direct response marketing. His clients have ranged from small entrepreneurial organizations to international corporations. His services include providing corporate executives with growth strategies. He has written books which address economic strategies, following the early 1990s recession and the recession of 2008. Abraham has also served as a keynote speaker at corporate events and conferences in countries throughout the world, including the United States, Mexico, Russia, China, and Australia. He is also a direct response copywriter.

Board memberships 
 EFactor.com – Board of Advisors (2011–present)

Published works 
 Abraham, Jay (2000). Getting Everything You Can Out of All You've Got: 21 Ways You Can Out-Think, Out-Perform, and Out-Earn the Competition, Truman Talley Books, 384 pages. 
 Abraham, Jay (2009). The Sticking Point Solution: 9 Ways to Move Your Business from Stagnation to Stunning Growth in Tough Economic Times, Vanguard Press, 272 pages. 
 Abraham Jay, Jason Williford (2021). The Ultimate Real Estate Machine: How Team Leaders Can Build a Prestigious Brand and Have Explosive Growth with More Freedom and Less Risk, 254 pages

Television and Film 
 Jay Abraham Documentary (2019). Getting Everything You Can Out of All You've Got: The Jay Abraham Story

References

External links 
 
 The Jay Abraham Story – Documentary
 Jay Abraham - China Connection

Living people
American consultants
Businesspeople from Indianapolis
1949 births
American writers
American business executives
21st-century American businesspeople
20th-century American businesspeople
20th-century American writers
American public speakers